Shéhérazade is a 1963  adventure film directed by Pierre Gaspard-Huit and starring Anna Karina as the title character. The cast also featured Gérard Barray, Antonio Vilar and Giuliano Gemma The film is loosely based on the One Thousand and One Nights. The film's sets and costumes were designed by the art director Georges Wakhévitch.

Plot
Baghdad in the year 809. The city is ruled by the Caliph, Haroun-al-Rashid, to whom the beautiful and spiritual Scheherazade has been promised. Ambassadors of Charlemagne arrive in Baghdad to ask the Caliph for free access to the Christian holy sites. Among these envoys from the west is the knight Renaud Villecroix, who falls in love with her. The grand vizier, enemy of the Caliph, ambushes a traveling party and takes Scheherazade prisoner, threatening to cut off her head. Renaud saves her and flees into the desert with her.

Cast
 Anna Karina as Shéhérazade
 Gérard Barray as Renaud de Villecroix
 Antonio Vilar as Haroun-al-Raschid
 Giuliano Gemma as Didier
 Marilù Tolo as Shirin
 Fausto Tozzi as Barmak
 Gil Vidal - Thierry
 Jorge Mistral as Grand Vizir Zaccar
 Fernando Rey
 Joëlle LaTour as Anira
 Rafael Albaicín
 Karamoko Cisse
 María Calvi
 José Calvo
 Félix Fernández
 María Granada
 José Manuel Martín (as J.M. Martín)

Release
The film was released in France on May 15, 1963.

It was the 46th top-grossing film of 1963 in France, where it sold 1,375,848 tickets at the box office. In Poland, it sold more than  tickets, making it one of the thirteen highest-grossing foreign films in Poland .

References

External links

1963 films
1963 adventure films
1960s French-language films
Films based on One Thousand and One Nights
Films directed by Pierre Gaspard-Huit
Films produced by Serge Silberman
Films set in the 9th century
French adventure films
Italian adventure films
Spanish adventure films
1960s French films
1960s Italian films
1960s Spanish films